Onchocerca gutturosa is a species of nematodes belonging to the family Onchocercidae.

The species is found Africa and Northern America.

References

Spirurida